KXD or kxd may refer to:

 KXD, a brand used by KXDF-CD, a television station licensed to Fairbanks, Alaska, United States
 IATA code for Kondinskoye Airport, a minor airport in Russia
 ISO 639-3 code for the Kedayan language, aka Brunei Malay